The slate-colored antbird (Myrmelastes schistaceus) is a species of bird in the family Thamnophilidae. It is found in Brazil, Colombia, Ecuador, and Peru. Its natural habitat is subtropical or tropical moist lowland forest.

The slate-colored antbird was described by the English zoologist Philip Sclater in 1858 and given the binomial name Hypnocmenis schistacea.

References

slate-colored antbird
Birds of the Amazon Basin
Birds of the Peruvian Amazon
slate-colored antbird
slate-colored antbird
Taxonomy articles created by Polbot